The 2016 Honkbal Hoofdklasse season began Thursday, April 14.

Standings

References

Honkbal Hoofdklasse
2016 in baseball